
Gmina Sulechów is an urban-rural gmina (administrative district) in Zielona Góra County, Lubusz Voivodeship, in western Poland.

Villages
Apart from the town of Sulechów, Gmina Sulechów contains the villages and settlements of Boryń, Brody, Brzezie (Pomorsko), Brzezie (Sulechów), Buków, Cigacice, Głogusz, Górki Małe, Górzykowo, Kalsk, Karczyn, Kije, Klępsk, Krężoły, Kruszyna, Laskowo, Łęgowo, Leśna Góra, Mozów, Nowy Klępsk, Nowy Świat, Obłotne, Okunin, Pomorsko, Przygubiel and Szabliska.

Neighbouring gminas
Gmina Sulechów is bordered by the gminas of Babimost, Czerwieńsk, Kargowa, Skąpe, Świebodzin, Szczaniec, Trzebiechów, Zabór and city of Zielona Góra.

Twin towns – sister cities

Gmina Sulechów is twinned with:
 Criuleni, Moldova
 Fürstenwalde, Germany
 Rushmoor, England, United Kingdom

References

External links
Official website

Sulechow
Zielona Góra County